Mohamed Mahsoub Abdel Meguid  is an Egyptian politician and former minister of state for parliamentary affairs, who served in the Qandil cabinet for a short time in 2012.

Career and activities
Mahsoub is one of the vice-presidents of the Al Wasat Party, a moderate Islamist party. The party consists mainly of former members of the Muslim Brotherhood. In 2000, Mahsoub was a candidate in the parliamentary elections as independent candidate; however, he was not elected.

He was appointed minister of state for parliamentary affairs, being the only member of the party serving in the cabinet, on 2 August 2012. He was also head of the drafting committee and a member of the Constituent Assembly charged with drafting Egypt’s new constitution.

Mahsoub resigned from his post on 27 December 2012 in protest against the decision by President Mohamed Morsi to reshuffle the cabinet but keep prime minister Hesham Qandil. Omar Salem succeeded him as state minister for parliamentary affairs in a cabinet reshuffle on 5 January 2013.

On 29 July 2013, Mahsoub was part of a delegation of the National Coalition for Supporting Legitimacy that met the High Representative of the European Union for Foreign Policy, Catherine Ashton, in Cairo to discuss possible solutions for the crisis in Egypt in the aftermath of the military coup.

Controversy
In July 2013, following the military coup against president Morsi, the Twitter account of Mahsoub was hacked by unknown persons, and fake tweets were posted in his name, claiming that the Muslim Brotherhood is burning Egypt and intending to produce seas of blood in order to blame it on the army.

References

External links

Living people
Parliamentary affairs ministers of Egypt
Qandil Cabinet
Year of birth missing (living people)